Miljan Mutavdžić (born 3 February 1986) is a Serbian professional footballer who plays as a central or defensive midfielder.

Between 2008 and 2009, Mutavdžić earned two international caps for the Serbian national team, both friendlies.

Club career

Early years
Mutavdžić made his senior debut while playing for Bane in the Second League of Serbia and Montenegro. He then moved to Javor Ivanjica in the winter of 2005, spending there the following four years, until the winter of 2009. Mutavdžić was a member of the team that won the 2007–08 Serbian First League with an unbeaten record. He also went on a six-month loan to Metalac Gornji Milanovac in the first half of the 2005–06 season.

Malmö FF
In March 2009, Mutavdžić was officially transferred to Malmö FF. He scored on his league debut for the club in a 1–0 away victory over BK Häcken. However, Mutavdžić suffered a knee injury less than a week later, causing him to miss the rest of the 2009 season. He faced some problems while recovering from his injury, but managed to play 12 league games in the 2010 season, helping the club win its first Allsvenskan title since 2004. Fully recovered, Mutavdžić played regularly during the 2011 season, making 22 league appearances and scoring once. He also made nine appearances in European competitions that year, when the club was eliminated in the play-off round of the Champions League, before reaching the group stage of the Europa League.

Return to Serbia
In the 2012 winter transfer window, Mutavdžić returned to Serbia after three years by joining Radnički Kragujevac. He moved to his hometown club Novi Pazar in January 2013. On 16 July 2014, Mutavdžić signed a two-year contract with newly promoted SuperLiga club Borac Čačak.

International career
On 14 December 2008, Mutavdžić made his international debut for Serbia in a friendly match against Poland in Antalya. His second appearance for the national team came in another friendly match, on 11 February 2009, against Ukraine in Nicosia.

Statistics

Club

International

Honours
Javor Ivanjica
 Serbian First League: 2007–08

Malmö FF
 Allsvenskan: 2010

References

External links
 
 
 
 Reprezentacija profile

Serbian footballers
Allsvenskan players
Association football midfielders
Expatriate footballers in Sweden
FK Bane players
FK Borac Čačak players
FK Javor Ivanjica players
FK Metalac Gornji Milanovac players
FK Novi Pazar players
FK Radnički 1923 players
FK Radnik Surdulica players
Malmö FF players
Sportspeople from Novi Pazar
Serbia international footballers
Serbia under-21 international footballers
Serbian expatriate footballers
Serbian expatriate sportspeople in Sweden
Serbian SuperLiga players
Serbian First League players
1986 births
Living people